Savioja may refer to several places in Estonia:
Savioja, Rõuge Parish, village in Võru County, Estonia
Savioja, Võru Parish, village in Võru County, Estonia